Juan Carlos Onetti Borges (July 1, 1909 – May 30, 1994) was a Uruguayan novelist and author of short stories.

Early life
Onetti was born in Montevideo, Uruguay. He was the son of Carlos Onetti, a customs official, and Honoria Borges, who belonged to a Brazilian aristocratic family from the state of Rio Grande do Sul. He had two siblings: an older brother Raul, and a younger sister Rachel.  

The original surname of his family was O'Nety (of Irish or Scottish origin). The writer himself commented: "the first to come here, my great-great-grandfather, was English, born in Gibraltar. My grandfather was the one who italianized the name".

Career
A high school drop-out, Onetti's first novel, El pozo, published in 1939, met with his close friends' immediate acclaim, as well as from some writers and journalists of his time. 500 copies of the book were printed, most of them left to rot at the only bookstore that sold it, Barreiro (the book was not reprinted until the 1960s, with an introduction and preliminary study by Ángel Rama). Aged 30, Onetti was already working as editing secretary of the famous weekly Uruguayan newspaper Marcha. He had lived for some years in Buenos Aires, where he published short stories and wrote cinema critiques for the local media, and met and befriended  novelist and journalist Roberto Arlt, author of the novels El juguete rabioso, Los siete locos, Los lanzallamas.

He went on to become one of Latin America's most distinguished writers, earning Uruguay National Literature Prize in 1962. He was considered a senior member of the 'Generation of 45', a Uruguayan intellectual and literary movement: Carlos Maggi, Manuel Flores Mora, Ángel Rama, Emir Rodríguez Monegal, Idea Vilariño, Carlos Real de Azúa, Mauricio Muller, José Pedro Díaz, Amanda Berenguer, Mario Benedetti, Ida Vitale, Líber Falco, among others.

In 1974, he and some of his colleagues were imprisoned by the military dictatorship. Their crime: as members of the jury, they had chosen Nelson Marra's short story El guardaespaldas (i.e. "The bodyguard") as the winner of Marcha'''s annual literary contest. Due to a series of misunderstandings (and the need to fill some space in the following day's edition), El guardaespaldas was published in Marcha, although it had been widely agreed among them that they shouldn't do so due to its sensitive political themes.    
 
Onetti left his native country (and his much-loved city of Montevideo) after being imprisoned for 6 months in Colonia Etchepare, a mental institution. A long list of world-famous writers -including Gabriel García Márquez, Mario Vargas Llosa and Mario Benedetti – signed open letters addressed to the military government of Uruguay.

As soon as he was released, Onetti fled to Spain with his wife,  violinist Dorothea Muhr. There he continued his career as a writer, being awarded the most prestigious literary prize in the Spanish-speaking world, the Premio Cervantes. He remained in Madrid until his death there in 1994. He is interred in the Cementerio de la Almudena in Madrid.

Writing awards
Uruguay National Literature Prize (1962)
William Faulkner Foundation Ibero-American Award (1963)
Italian-Latin American Institute Prize (1972)
Premio Cervantes (1980)

Selected worksEl pozo (1939) –  The PitTierra de nadie (1941) –  No Man's LandPara esta noche (1943) –  TonightLa vida breve (1950) –  A Brief LifeUn sueño realizado y otros cuentos (1951)Los adioses (1954)Para una tumba sin nombre (1959) –  A Grave with No NameLa cara de la desgracia (1960)El astillero (1961) –  The ShipyardJuntacadáveres (1964) –  Body SnatcherTres novelas (1967)Cuentos completos (1967)Los rostros del amor (1968)Novelas y cuentos cortos completos (1968)Obras completas (1970)La muerte y la niña (1973)Cuentos completos (1974)Tiempo de abrazar (1974)Réquiem por Faulkner (1975)Tan triste como ella y otros cuentos (1976)Dejemos hablar al viento (1979) –  Let the Wind SpeakCuentos secretos (1986)Presencia y otros cuentos (1986)Cuando entonces (1987)Goodbyes and Other Stories (1990)Cuando ya no importe (1993) –  Past Caring

Film adaptations
Uruguayan director Alvaro Brechner adapted "Jacob y el Otro" for his 2009 film Bad day to go fishing ("Mal día para pescar"). The film premiered at 2009 Cannes Film Festival, and was the Uruguayan candidate for Oscar Academy Award for Best Foreign Language Film.
There is an Argentinian film based on his short story "El infierno tan temido."

Legacy
An important literary award from Montevideo is named after him: Concurso Literario Juan Carlos Onetti.

References

Further readingEnglishJuan Carlos Onetti, Manuel Puig and Luisa Valenzuela : marginality and gender / Linda Craig., 2005
Onetti and others : comparative essays on a major figure in Latin American literature / Gustavo San Román., 1999
Over her dead body : the construction of male subjectivity in Onetti / Judy Maloof., 1995
An analysis of the short stories of Juan Carlos Onetti : fictions of desire / Mark Millington., 1993
The landscapes of alienation : ideological subversion in Kafka, Céline, and Onetti / Jack Murray., 1991
Reading Onetti : language, narrative, and the subject / Mark Millington., 1985
Juan Carlos Onetti / Djelal Kadir., 1977
Three authors of alienation : Bombal, Onetti, Carpentier / Michael Ian Adams., 1975
The formal expression of meaning in Juan Carlos Onetti's narrative art / Yvonne Perier Jones., 1971SpanishBienvenido, Juan : textos críticos y testimoniales sobre Juan Carlos Onetti / Carina Blixen., 2007
Onetti, la fundación imaginada : la parodia del author en la saga de Santa María / Roberto Ferro., 2003
El sueño y la locura en la narrativa de Juan Carlos Onetti / Moira Bailey J., 1998
La Obra de Juan Carlos Onetti : coloquio internacional / Université de Poitiers., 1990
Identidad rioplatense, 1930 : la escritura colloquial : Borges, Arlt, Hernández, Onetti / Noemí Ulla., 1990
Juan Carlos Onetti, papeles críticos : medio siglo de escritura / Jaime Concha., 1989
J.C. Onetti : el espectáculo imaginario, II / José Pedro Díaz., 1989
Construcción de la noche. La vida de Juan Carlos Onetti / Carlos María Dominguez., 1993
Juan Carlos Onetti / Hugo J Verani., 1987
El primer Onetti y sus contextos / María C Milián-Silveira., 1986
Juan C. Onetti / Emir Rodríguez Monegal., 1985
Onetti, calculado infortunio / Fernando Curiel., 1984
La dialectica de la identidad en la obra de Juan Carlos Onetti / Juan Manuel Molina., 1982
Onetti, el ritual de la impostura / Hugo J Verani., 1981
Juan Carlos Onetti, o, la salvación por la escritura / Omar Prego., 1981
Onetti, obra y calculado infortunio / Fernando Curiel., 1980
El viaje a la ficción: El mundo de Juan Carlos Onetti / Mario Vargas Llosa., 2008

External links

LookSmart's FindArticles – Projection as a narrative technique in Juan Carlos Onetti's 'Goodbyes'" – Studies in Short Fiction'', Summer, 1994, by Mary-Lee Sullivan
A Reign Not of This World: On Juan Carlos Onetti by Jonathan Blitzer
Centenario Onetti: Nora Catelli, Andrés Ehrenhaus y Edgardo Dobri en Canal-L de Barcelona
Marcha
The Tender Stories of Juan Carlos Onetti, a Lost Giant of Latin-American Literature

1909 births
1994 deaths
People from Montevideo
Uruguayan people of Brazilian descent
Premio Cervantes winners
Uruguayan novelists
Male novelists
Uruguayan prisoners and detainees
Uruguayan male short story writers
Uruguayan short story writers
20th-century novelists
Burials at Cementerio de la Almudena
Uruguayan expatriates in Argentina
Uruguayan expatriates in Spain
20th-century short story writers
20th-century Uruguayan male writers